Mitran Da Naa Chalda is a 2023 Indian Punjabi-language, comedy-drama film directed by Pankaj Batra. The film stars Gippy Grewal, Tania and Raj Shokar. The film was released under the banner of Zee Studios and Pankaj Batra films.

Premise 
The movie is about an underdog guy, played by Gippy Grewal who is always bullied during his childhood days because of his stammering. He dropped out of school in his early years, but he learned a lot about legal and court cases while growing up with his maternal uncle, who works at a court. The story is about this protagonist helping a few girls coming out of a big case using his skills and brains. During this journey, he had to face a lot of challenges and pressure, but the question is will he be able to find out the truth?

Cast 
 Gippy Grewal as Laddi
 Tania as Binder
 Raj Shokar as Karam
 Shweta Tiwari
 Renu Kaushal as Heena
 Nirmal Rishi
 Hardip Gill
 Anita Devgan
 Sanju Solankt Rangdev
 Deedar Gill
 Aarchi Sachdeva
 Harnidh
 Resty Kamboi
 Sanjiv Attri
 Rajeev Mehra
 Surinder Narula

Music

Marketing & release 
The official trailer of this film was released on 9 February 2023 on YouTube by Gem Tunes Punjabi.

Theatrical 
The film was released in theaters on March 8, 2023.

Home media
The film will release on ZEE5 after its theatrical release.

Reception 
Mitraan Da Naa Chalda received mixed to positive reviews from critics. The Indian Express rated the film 2 out of 5 stars and wrote, "Not-so-subtle drama that bites off more than it can chew.". Archika Khurana from The Times of India gave the film rating of 4 out of 5 stars and wrote, " Gippy Grewal's social commentary strikes the right balance of levity and drama".

References

External links
 
 
 Mitran Da Naa Chalda Review at Iampunjaabi

2023 films
Punjabi-language films